The Morning After is the third album by Canadian singer-songwriter Deborah Cox. It was released on November 5, 2002 in the United States. The Morning After marked the Cox's first record under Clive Davis's J Records roster, with Davis once more serving as executive producer. Keen to build on the success of her previous album One Wish (1998), he enlisted the help of renowned producers such as Jimmy Jam and Terry Lewis, Jermaine Dupri, Rodney "Darkchild" Jerkins, and Shep Crawford as well as up-and-coming producers Warryn Campbell, Johntá Austin and Alex Richbourg, among others.

The album contains a blend of urban R&B and adult contemporary songs with additional dance/house tracks being include. It became her biggest-charting album on the US Billboard 200 yet, debuting and peaking at number 38, and remains her highest-charting album as of 2018. Commercially, the album was less successful than her previous album however. The Morning After album generated four singles, including "Mr Lonely" and "Play Your Part". A 2-CD limited edition version of the album was released with additional dance remixes.

Track listing

Charts

References

External links 
 

2002 albums
Deborah Cox albums
J Records albums
Albums produced by Battlecat (producer)
Albums produced by Jermaine Dupri
Albums produced by Jimmy Jam and Terry Lewis
Albums produced by Warryn Campbell
Albums with cover art by Tony Duran
House music albums by Canadian artists